Jeremy Peter Jackson (born October 1975) is a British businessman, the chief executive officer (CEO) of Flutter Entertainment since January 2018.

Early life
Jeremy Peter Jackson was born in October 1975 in Yorkshire, England. He has a bachelor's degree in manufacturing engineering from Pembroke College, Cambridge University.

Career
Jackson has worked at Lloyds Bank, Halifax Bank of Scotland and McKinsey & Company, and was CEO of Travelex from 2010 to 2015.

On 26 January 2016, Banco Santander appointed Jackson as their new head of the Group´s Innovation area, he replaces José María Fuster who, after more than 30 years service with the Santander Group, will continue as an external advisor.

On 1 March 2017, Jackson joined Worldpay UK as CEO of its UK operations, replacing Dave Hobday who left Worldpay in December to head up the RAC.

In August 2017, it was announced that Jackson would succeed Breon Corcoran as CEO of Paddy Power Betfair in January 2018.

In July 2017, it was announced that Jackson would become the Chairman for Aire Labs, a technology startup in London.

References

1975 births
Living people
Alumni of Pembroke College, Cambridge
British chief executives
Businesspeople from Leeds